Khanom khai hong, formerly known as khanom khai hia, is a kind of Thai dessert. It may be considered as a Thai-style doughnut balls.

Khanom khai hong is fried dessert balls made of flour stuffed with seasoning mung bean, before being deep-fried and coated with icing or white sesame seeds. Its taste is sweet, salty; crispy outside, but soft inside.

Its name literally means "swan-egg snack", due to its shape looks like a swan egg. It is said that during the early Rattanakosin Kingdom, the King Phutthayotfa Chulalok (Rama I) was a person who liked to eat water monitor eggs. But at one time, it was not the season in which water monitors laid eggs, therefore the eggs could not be found. Royal Concubine Waen (เจ้าจอมแว่น) therefore invented this dessert in order to serve the King. So it was called khanom khai hia according to what it replaced. Later, it was renamed to khanom khai hong as in the present, because water monitors and their Thai name, in the belief of Thai people, are related to bad and evil things.

Currently, khanom khai hong can be found that its best from street vendors or food markets like other desserts.

References

Thai desserts and snacks
Thai doughnuts
Stuffed desserts